Kramer Morgenthau, A.S.C. (born 1966), is an American cinematographer known for his expertise as a visual storyteller in both television and film. The six-time Emmy nominee is best known for his work in films such as Respect, The Many Saints of Newark, Creed II and Thor: The Dark World. He was also director of photography for television projects such as HBO's Game of Thrones, Boardwalk Empire, and Fahrenheit 451. He is a member of both the Morgenthau family and the Lehman family.

Biography
Morgenthau's early career began in New York as a documentary filmmaker, which led to shooting Oscar-winner Allan Miller's Academy Award-nominated film, Small Wonders as well as Sundance Festival feature film, Joe & Joe, which began his years as a festival fixture, shooting seven more features and documentaries that played there.
Initially, he was artistically inspired by his family and unique childhood in Cambridge, Massachusetts.  His father, Henry Morgenthau III, was a producer of documentaries for the flagship PBS station, WGBH-TV, in Boston and his mother, Ruth, was a Polish Jewish refugee of WWII Vienna, African politics professor and trusted advisor to three American Presidents. It is through them that Morgenthau was first exposed to the importance and influence of film on culture, politics, art and rural development with the family's extensive travel and various documentary location shoots around the globe.

His great-great-grandfather was businessman Mayer Lehman. He has one brother, Henry "Ben" Morgenthau and one sister, Sarah Elinor Morgenthau Wessel. His grandfather was Henry Morgenthau Jr., the U.S. Treasury secretary during the Roosevelt administration. His great-grandfather, Henry Morgenthau, was the ambassador to the Ottoman Empire during World War I; his uncle is Robert M. Morgenthau, Manhattan district attorney for 35 years.

Morgenthau is an active member of the Academy of Motion Picture Arts and Sciences, the American Society of Cinematographers, the Academy of Television Arts and Sciences, and the International Cinematographers Guild. He currently lives in Los Angeles, California with his wife and twin children.

Filmography
Film

Television

References

External links

American cinematographers
American people of German-Jewish descent
Living people
Lehman family
Kramer
1966 births